Flying Days is a 1966 Soviet drama film directed by Nikolai Litus and Leonid Rizin.

Plot 
The film tells about three young pilots who experience supersonic fighters. They have to endure a difficult test...

Cast 
 Nikolay Olyalin as Nikolay Bordyrev
 Yuriy Kuzmenkov as Andrey
 Vladimir Petchenko as Aleksey (as V. Petchenko)
 Ada Voloshina as Lesya (as A. Voloshina)
 Vera Alentova as Lidia Fyodorovna
 Nikolay Eryomenko as Nikolay Nikolayevich (as N. Yeryomenko)
 Nikolai Barmin as general Barabin (as N. Barmin)
 Boris Savchenko as Letchik (as B. Savchenko)

References

External links 
 

1966 films
1960s Russian-language films
Soviet drama films
1966 drama films